Yorkton is a city in Saskatchewan, Canada.

Yorkton may also refer to:
 Yorkton (electoral district), a former Canadian political division
 Yorkton (N.W.T. electoral district), a former Canadian political division
 Yorkton (provincial electoral district), in Canada
 Yorkton Municipal Airport, in Saskatchewan, Canada
 CFS Yorkton, a former radar installation
 Yorkton Creek, a river in Saskatchewan

See also 
Yorktown (disambiguation)